Daniel Galmiche (born 18 June 1958 in  Lure Haute-Saône, France) is a French chef. He has been a Michelin Starred chef since 1990. His light and colorful cooking is permeated with north–south mixtures thanks to his European and Asiatic career. According to him, cooking is done with eco-friendly and healthy products, it needs to be shared. He has written in magazines and English newspapers, published books and hosted cooking shows on the BBC.

Biography 

Daniel Galmiche loves cooking since its earliest years. This love appeared through healthy and natural products from his grandparents’ farm, from hunting with his father as well as fragrances from his mother cooking.
He apprenticed at the gourmet restaurant of Chef Yves Lalloz, Luxeuil-les-Bains.
He improved his work in La Napoule, in the south of France then abroad in Sweden, Singapore and Portugal.

Career 
In 1977, Daniel
Galmiche practised in London with the help of the
great French chef Michel Roux. He was elected Chef of the 1987–1988 season in Scotland.

During the 1989–1990 season, he got the Michelin Star at Knockingam Lodge Hotel.

He joined the Harveys Bristol Restaurant in 1996 and the Ortolan in 2002, where
he both maintains the Michelin Starred title.

Two years later, he
was the Great Chef at Cliveden House, and won again the Michelin Star in 2006.
Then it's the Eden and Le Cerise Forbury  in 2008 followed the next year by the Vineyard stockcross always as Grand Chef.

He is a member and judge Bailiwick of Great Britain in 2010 of Confrérie de la chaîne des rôtisseurs.

He won the Rising Chef Trophy in 2010-2011 and travels the world : Mauritius, Abu Dhabi, Malta, Dubai, where he prepares gourmet dinners prestige.

Parallel to these activities and true to his roots, he is involved in the defense of ecology and healthy products as a regular juror of The Soil Association Organic Awards, advocacy group for environmentally friendly products and respect for animals

Works

Bibliography

Broadcasts BBC
BBC One Saturday kitchen 2008-2009
BBC Radio Berkshire 2011
BBC Saturday Kitchen recipes 2013
BBC One Christmas Kitchen 2012-2013

References

1958 births
Living people
French expatriates in the United Kingdom
French chefs
Head chefs of Michelin starred restaurants